Back to the Bus is a compilation of the British band Babyshambles's favourite songs, released on 4 September 2006.

Track listing
 The Creation – Making Time (2:53)
 The Clash – Jail Guitar Doors (2:49)
 Littl'ans – Their Way (2:59)
 Love – Your Friend and Mine - Neil's Songs (3:35)
 Dennis Brown – Money in My Pocket (3:48)
 Cazals – New Boy in Town (2:27)
 Social – To the Bone (3:15)
 Johnny Thunders – Chinese Rocks (2:49)
 Noisettes – IWE (3:25)
 Saint Etienne – Only Love Can Break Your Heart (4:28)
 Esther Phillips – Just Say Goodbye (2:12)
 Graham Collier – Aberdeen Angus (6:00)
 Belle & Sebastian – Mornington Crescent (5:29)
 Bert Jansch – Needle of Death (3:16)
 The Stone Roses – Going Down (2:45)
 Babyshambles – What Katy Did (acoustic) (2:11)
 Tourbus Tales – Babyshambles interview (8:29)

References

Babyshambles albums
2006 compilation albums